Brendan Patrick Toibin (born February 2, 1964) is a former American football placekicker in the National Football League for the Washington Redskins.  He played college football at the University of Richmond.  Brendan played at Monacan High School in Richmond, Virginia.

1964 births
2013 deaths
Living people
Players of American football from Columbia, South Carolina
American football placekickers
Richmond Spiders football players
Washington Redskins players